The Agriculture and Technical Instruction (Ireland) Act 1902 (2 Edw. 7 c. 3) was an Act of Parliament of the Parliament of the United Kingdom, given the royal assent on 23 June 1902.

The council of any county defined as a "congested districts county" by the Purchase of Land (Ireland) Act 1891 was permitted, when raising any sum for agriculture or technical training, to exclude the congested districts from the area from which the sum was levied.

References
The Public General Acts Passed in the Second Year of the Reign of His Majesty King Edward the Seventh. London: printed for His Majesty's Stationery Office. 1902.
Chronological table of the statutes; HMSO, London. 1993.

United Kingdom Acts of Parliament 1902
Agriculture in Ireland
Agriculture legislation in the United Kingdom
Acts of the Parliament of the United Kingdom concerning Ireland
1902 in Ireland